Sid Mashburn is an American fashion designer and head of his eponymous brand based in Atlanta.

Stores
The brand has brick-and-mortar stores in Houston, Dallas, Washington D.C., and Los Angeles. The brand's concept store in Atlanta's Westside Provisions District carries its children's line, Kid Mashburn.

History 
Mashburn designed for J.Crew, Ralph Lauren, Tommy Hilfiger and Lands' End, and launched his namesake label in 2007 with his wife; she launched her  women's  line, Ann Mashburn, in 2010.

References

External links
 Official Website
Menswear Expert Sid Mashburn on the 6 Items Every Guy Should Own Esquire, March 22, 2017
Up Your Style IQ this Summer at Sid Mashburn: A series of casual explainers on how to pack, tie a tie, and more are in store. Sarah Rufca Nielsen, Houstonia Magazine, 8 August 2017

See also
Perry Ellis
Geoffrey Beene
Bill Blass
Billy Reid
Ralph Lauren
Joseph Abboud
John Varvatos
Todd Snyder

Living people
American fashion designers
American fashion businesspeople
Menswear designers
Culture of the Southern United States
Clothing brands of the United States
Luxury brands
Year of birth missing (living people)